Organizational hologram is the method of organization theories described in the book The Organizational Hologram: The Effective Management of Organizational Change (1991), by Kenneth D. Mackenzie.

It is claimed that if an organization has twelve holonomic processes working, it would have the property of achieving and maintaining dynamic congruency and would be simultaneously efficient, adaptable, and efficiently adaptable.

Holonomic theory states that an organization has 12 management processes (HPs) that drive performance on six desired organizational characteristics (DOCs).

Desired organizational characteristics
DOC-1 Clarity of Direction
DOC-2 Clarity of Structures
DOC-3 Clarity of Measurement
DOC-4 Successful Goal Achievement
DOC-5 Results Oriented Problem Solving
DOC-6 Associates Are Assets and Resources

Holonomic processes
HP-1 Establishing and Maintaining Clear Strategic Direction
HP-2 Defining and Updating the Organizational Logic
HP-3 Ensuring Best Decision Making
HP-4 Adapting to Ensure Position Clarity
HP-5 Ensuring Systematic Planning that is Workable, Involved, and Understood
HP-6 Integrating Employee Selection, Development, and Flow with the Strategic Direction
HP-7 Nurturing and Rewarding Opportunistic and Innovative Problem Solving
HP-8 Ensuring Healthy Problem Solving Throughout the Organization
HP-9 Setting Tough and Realistic Performance Standards
HP-10 Operating Equitable and Effective Rewards Systems
HP-11 Ensuring Compatibility of Interests
HP-12 Encouraging and Rewarding Ethical Behavior for All Associates

Sources
Glossary for the Holonomic Model

Management systems